Kyaukpadaung Township is a township of Nyaung-U District (until 2014, part of Myingyan District) in Mandalay Region of Burma (Myanmar). Its administrative seat is the town of Kyaukpadaung. Important towns include Popaywa and Seiktein (Seikhtain).

Geography
Kyaukpadaung Township is the southwesternmost township in Myingyan District and borders the following:
 Taungtha Township to the north
 Mahlaing Township to the northeast
 Meiktila Township to the east
 Natmauk Township of Magwe Region to the south
 Yenangyaung Township of Magwe Region to the southwest
 Chauk Township of Magwe Region to the west, and
 Nyaung-U Township to the northwest

The township includes Mount Popa, the Popa Taungkalat monastery, the Salay ruins from the 12th and 13th centuries and the Kyetmauk Taung Reservoir.

External links
 "Kyaukpadaung Township, Mandalay Division" map ID:MIMU154_Kyaukpadaung_Township_100111, created: 11 January 2010, Myanmar Information Management Unit (MIMU)
 "Kyaukpadaung Google Satellite Map" Maplandia World Gazetteer

Townships of Mandalay Region